Thenmerku Paruvakatru is a 2010 Indian Tamil-language drama film written and directed by Seenu Ramasamy and produced by Shibu Issac. The film is named after a song composed by A. R. Rahman for the film, Karuthamma. It stars Vijay Sethupathi, Vasundhara Kashyap and Saranya Ponvannan in her 100th film, which won her Best Actress at National film Awards. The music was composed by N. R. Raghunanthan with cinematography by Chezhiyan and editing by Mu. Kasivishwanathan.

The film released on 24 December 2010 to moderate reviews and did average collections.

The film received mixed reviews, but was eventually featured at the 58th National Film Awards ceremony, where it was named the Best Feature Film in Tamil while Saranya Ponvannan and lyricist Vairamuthu were awarded the Best Actress and Best Lyricist prizes, respectively.

Plot
Set in the backdrop of Theni, the story is about Murugaiyan (aka Murugan), who is a goatherd. He has a loving mother, Veerayi, who is a widow. She struggles hard to raise Murugan but has an overflowing affection for him. Meanwhile, there is a gang which attacks the villagers at night and steals their goats. Murugan, along with his group, manages to catch one of the members in an attack and discovers that it is a girl. Her name is Pechi, and her family steals goats for their livelihood. While Murugan develops feelings for her, Pechi's family is known to be quite dangerous. Veerayi learns of this and asked Murugan to marry a girl of her choice. He refuses to accept her wish. However, complications arise between them. An old lady of her house tells Veerayi to let her son marry the girl whom he loves. A possessive widow tells how her husband was killed to that old lady. Her husband was killed by a group of thieves. The head of the gang is none other than the father of the girl whom her son loves.

Cast

 Vijay Sethupathi as Murugaiyan
 Vasundhara Kashyap as Pechi
 Saranya Ponvannan as Veerayi
 Aruldoss as Mokkaiyan
 Kadhal Sukumar
 Ajayan Bala
 Theepetti Ganesan
 "Stills" Kumar as Marichami
 Hemalatha as Kalaichelvi
 Jyothi
 Meenakshi
 Shobana
 Kambam Guna
 Seenu Ramasamy as Doctor (cameo appearance)

Soundtrack

The music of the film was composed by debutant N. R. Raghunanthan. Vairamuthu won the National Film Award for Best Lyrics for the song "Kalli Kaattil".

Release
Thenmerku Paruvakkaatru was released on 24 December 2010.

Critical reception
The Hindu wrote, "Thenmerku Paruvakkaatru with its mother sentiment makes a mark among films with rural themes". Sify called the film "OK" and wrote, "It is made like a [1970s] tear jerker with the central character being the all sacrificing mother". The New Indian Express wrote, "A film that has worked out well in all departments, Thenmerku Paruvakaatru is worth a watch. Behindwoods gave 1 out of 5 stars and wrote, "While the opening scene makes one sit up and take notice, the movie pales into insignificance soon after with nothing much to hold the viewer’s interest. Essentially, Thenmerkku Paruvakatru is a regular village drama and can easily be written down as one of those small timers aspiring to make a fast buck or two". i

Awards
National Film Awards
The film won three awards at the 58th National Film Awards:
 Won – Silver Lotus Award - Best Actress - Saranya Ponvannan
 Won – Silver Lotus Award - Best Lyricist - Vairamuthu - "Kallikattil pirantha Thayae..."
 Won – National Film Award for Best Feature Film in Tamil - Seenu Ramasamy

 Filmfare Awards South
Best Supporting Actress – Tamil – Saranya Ponvannan

 Vijay Awards
Best Supporting Actress – Saranya Ponvannan
Best Lyricist – Vairamuthu – "Kallikattil Pirantha Thayae..."
Special Jury Award

References

External links 
 

2010 films
Films featuring a Best Actress National Award-winning performance
2010s Tamil-language films
Indian drama films
Best Tamil Feature Film National Film Award winners
Films directed by Seenu Ramasamy
2010 drama films